The Arizona Court of Appeals is the intermediate appellate court for the state of Arizona. It is divided into two divisions, with a total of twenty-eight judges on the court: nineteen in Division 1, based in Phoenix, and nine in Division 2, based in Tucson.

History
The Arizona constitution was amended in 1960 to authorize a court of appeals, which the legislature created in 1964. The original judges were elected in November 1964.  The first judges were James Duke Cameron, Henry S. Stevens, and Francis J. Donofrio for Division 1, and Herbert F. Krucker, John F. Molloy, and James D. Hathaway for Division 2. Only one judge after the original six received their seat by election. After the introduction of merit selection in 1975, judges are appointed by the governor to fill vacancies or new positions. 

Three-judge panels were added to Division 1 in 1969, 1974, 1982, and 1989. Another judge was added in 1995 "so that the Chief Judge could devote time to the court's increasing administrative workload." Division 2 added three judges in 1985. Six more judges were added in 2022, three for each division.

Jurisdiction
The Court of Appeals has jurisdiction to consider appeals in civil cases, including juvenile and domestic relations matters, from the Arizona Superior Court.  The court also reviews workers’ compensation and unemployment benefits decisions, tax court decisions, and certain corporation commission decisions.

The court also has jurisdiction over appeals in criminal matters from superior court, except for cases in which a death sentence has been imposed.  Death penalty cases go directly to the Supreme Court of Arizona.

The court may also decide "petitions for special action," which is Arizona's term for petitions for special writs, such as certiorari, mandamus, prohibition, and interlocutory appeals.

Procedures

Selection of judges
Judges are selected by a modified form of the Missouri Plan.  A bipartisan commission considers applicants and sends a list of nominees to the governor.  The governor is required by law to appoint from this list based on merit, without regard to party affiliation.  Judges are then retained for an initial period, after which they are subject to a retention election.   If the judge wins the election, his/her term is six years.

Deciding cases
The Court of Appeals decides cases in panels of three judges, called "departments." Each department chooses a presiding judge from among the three. Division 1 also has a Chief Judge and Vice Chief Judge, elected by all judges in the division.

Divisions
While the Court of Appeals is divided into two geographic divisions in Phoenix and Tucson, the superior courts are bound by all of the Court of Appeals decisions, regardless of the division they are issued in. An Arizona trial court is not required to give greater precedent to a Court of Appeals decision from the division it is located in then a decision from the other division.
 Division 1 consists of Maricopa, Yuma, La Paz, Mohave, Coconino, Yavapai, Navajo and Apache counties.
 Division 2 consists of Pima, Pinal, Cochise, Santa Cruz, Greenlee, Graham and Gila counties.
At least ten judges of Division 1 must be residents of Maricopa county and five residents of the remaining counties. Four may be from any county.
At least four judges of Division 2 must be residents of Pima county and two residents of the remaining counties. Three may be from any county.

Division 1 has statewide responsibility for appeals from the Industrial Commission and unemployment compensation rulings of the Department of Economic Security. One department of Division 1 is responsible for appeals from the Tax Court.

Court members
The members of Arizona Court of Appeals Division 1, by order of seniority, include:

The members of Arizona Court of Appeals, Division 2 include:

Former judges

Several court of appeal judges were elevated to the Arizona Supreme Court, including: James Duke Cameron (1965–1971), Robert J. Corcoran (1981–1988), Ruth McGregor (1989–1998), Michael D. Ryan (1996–2002), Rebecca White Berch (1998–2002), Ann Timmer (2000–2012), Andrew Gould (2012–2017), and James Beene (2017–2019).

Other notable former judges include:
 Gary K. Nelson (1974–1978), former Arizona Attorney General.
 Mary M. Schroeder (1975–1979), current Senior Judge on the Ninth Circuit.
 Sandra Day O'Connor (1979–1981), former United States Supreme Court Justice.
 Sarah D. Grant (1982–1999).
 Jon W. Thompson (1995–2019), died in office.
 G. Murray Snow (2002–2008), current District Judge.
 Diane Johnsen (2006–2019).

See also
 Courts of Arizona

Notes

References

External links
 Arizona Court of Appeals, Division 1 website
 Arizona Court of Appeals, Division 2 website

Court of Appeals
State appellate courts of the United States
Courts and tribunals with year of establishment missing